The Basketball Bundesliga 2013–14 was the 48th season of the Basketball Bundesliga. The regular season started on 3 October 2013 and ended on 1 May 2014. Bayern Munich won its third German title, by beating Alba Berlin 3–1 in the Finals. Bayern player Malcolm Delaney was named both MVP and Finals MVP of the season.

Team information

Standings

|}

Results

Playoffs

Bracket

Quarterfinals
The quarterfinals were played between 10–21 May 2014 in a Best-of-five mode.

Bayern Munich vs. MHP Riesen Ludwigsburg

Brose Baskets vs. Artland Dragons

ALBA Berlin vs. ratiopharm Ulm

EWE Baskets Oldenburg vs. Telekom Baskets Bonn

Semifinals
The semifinals were played between 25 May–5 June 2014 in a Best-of-five mode.

Bayern Munich vs. EWE Baskets Oldenburg

ALBA Berlin vs. Artland Dragons

Final
The final was played between 8–22 June 2014 in a Best-of-five mode.

Bayern Munich vs. ALBA Berlin

Awards
Most Valuable Player:  Malcolm Delaney (Bayern Munich)
Finals MVP:  Malcolm Delaney (Bayern Munich)
Best German Young Player:  Daniel Theis (ratiopharm ulm)
Coach of the Year:  Silvano Poropat (Mitteldeutscher BC)
Most Improved Player:  Danilo Barthel (Fraport Skyliners)
Best Offensive Player:  Darius Adams (Eisbären Bremerhaven)
Best Defensive Player:  Cliff Hammonds (ALBA Berlin)

 
All-BBL First Team:
 Malcolm Delaney (Bayern Munich)
 Anton Gavel (Brose Baskets)
 Reggie Redding (ALBA Berlin)
 Angelo Caloiaro (Mitteldeutscher BC)
 D'or Fischer (Brose Baskets)

All-BBL Second Team:
 Jared Jordan (Brose Baskets)
 Julius Jenkins (EWE Baskets Oldenburg)
 Bryce Taylor (Bayern Munich)
 Deon Thompson (Bayern Munich)
 Leon Radošević (ALBA Berlin)

Statistical leaders
Points

Rebounds

Assists

References

External links
German League official website  

Basketball Bundesliga seasons
German
1